Wadąg river is a tributary of the Łyna in Poland. It starts from Wadąg Lake and flows into the Łyna near the city of Olsztyn. It has an overall length of 68 kilometers. It shares its name with the settlement of Wadąg through which it flows.

Rivers of Poland
Rivers of Warmian-Masurian Voivodeship